Maksim Sergeyevich Kanunnikov (born 14 July 1991) is a Russian football winger or striker.

Club career

Kanunnikov joined Zenit U21s in 2009 and shortly after started to train with the first team, appearing on the bench on occasion. He finally made his Premier League debut on 23 August 2009, coming as a last-minute substitute against Lokomotiv Moscow. On 10 May 2010 his first goal in Russian Premier League was against Amkar Perm.

On 17 January 2011, Kanunnikov was on loan to Tom Tomsk for the 2011–12 season.

On 2 March 2018, he was released by mutual consent from his contract by Rubin Kazan.

On 7 March 2018, he signed with SKA-Khabarovsk until the end of the 2017–18 season.

On 27 July 2018, he signed a one-year contract with Krylia Sovetov Samara. He left Krylia Sovetov at the end of the 2021–22 season.

International career
He made his debut for the Russia national football team on 26 May 2014 in a friendly game against Slovakia, replacing Alan Dzagoev at half time in a 1–0 win at Petrovsky Stadium.

On 2 June 2014, he was included in Russia's 2014 FIFA World Cup squad. He made his competitive debut for Russia in the second group game against Belgium on 22 June, playing the entire 90 minutes of the 1–0 defeat at the Maracanã.

Career honours
Zenit St. Petersburg
Russian Cup (1): 2010

Career statistics

References

External links

 
 Profile at the official FC Zenit St. Petersburg website 
 

1991 births
People from Nizhny Tagil
Living people
Russian footballers
Russia youth international footballers
Russia under-21 international footballers
Russia international footballers
Association football forwards
FC Zenit Saint Petersburg players
FC Tom Tomsk players
FC Amkar Perm players
FC Rubin Kazan players
FC SKA-Khabarovsk players
PFC Krylia Sovetov Samara players
Russian Premier League players
Russian First League players
2014 FIFA World Cup players
2017 FIFA Confederations Cup players
Sportspeople from Sverdlovsk Oblast